Conohyus was an extinct genus of suid that existed during the Miocene in Europe and in Asia.

Taxonomy
Conohyus sindiensis was reassigned to the genus Retroporcus by Pickford and Laurent (2014).

References

Prehistoric Suidae
Miocene mammals of Europe
Miocene even-toed ungulates
Prehistoric even-toed ungulate genera